Dharmam Vellum is a 1989 Indian Tamil-language action thriller film produced and directed by K. Rangaraj. The film stars Vijayakanth, Sujatha and Gautami. It was released on 28 October 1989, and had an average run at the box office.

Plot 

Jaganath lived with Saradha and his son Vijay with joy, while Saradha's father constantly humiliates him because he does not have enough resources. Disturbed, Jaganath try to explain with Saradha his father's inappropriate behavior towards him. With pride, one evening he abandons his wife and his son for whom he later integrates as police constable. Jaganath comes back to the house where he left them but they have moved. He sees her twenty five years later in crimes she committed and ends up in prison in which Inspector K. Jaganath appears as cop. She is accused of death penalty but Vijay goes to the rescue in jail to save her and captured her for her survival. In confrontation with his father, he gives her a challenge to find her.

Cast 
 Vijayakanth as Inspector K. Jaganath and Vijay
 Sujatha as Saradha
 Gautami as Latha
 Rohini as Geetha
 Vijayachander as Gangadharan
 S. S. Chandran as Sethu
 Senthil as Gethu
 Kovai Sarala as Jimmy
 Chinni Jayanth as Subbaraj
 LIC Narasimhan as Doctor
 Srikanth as Jagar (guest appearance)
 Delhi Ganesh as Robert (guest appearance)
 Vijay Krishnaraj as Vishwanath (guest appearance)

Soundtrack 
The background music and songs of the film were composed by Ilaiyaraaja. Lyrics of the songs were written by Vaali and Gangai Amaran. The song "Devi Devi" has two versions; the audio version had S. P. Balasubrahmanyam, K. S. Chithra rendering vocals while the film had version had vocals by Ilaiyaraaja.

Release and reception 
Dharmam Vellum was released on 28 October 1989, alongside another Vijayakanth film Rajanadai. Dharmam Vellum had an average run at the box office, which led Rangaraj to face financial problems. P. S. S. of Kalki wrote although murder and mystery are the core, it is a sentimental film shows the relationship between husband and wife, mother and son in the form of the story and the clever direction.

References

External links 
 

1980s Tamil-language films
1989 action thriller films
1989 films
Films directed by K. Rangaraj
Films scored by Ilaiyaraaja
Indian action thriller films